Octávio Cambalacho, was a Portuguese football player who played as a forward.

External links 
 
 

Portuguese footballers
Association football forwards
Vitória F.C. players
Portugal international footballers
Year of birth missing
Year of death missing